Anna Mae (also Anna May)  is a feminine double name, composed of Anna and Mae. Notable people with the name include:

Anna Mae Aquash (1945–1975), Mi'kmaq activist and member of the American Indian Movement
Anna Mae Bullock, better known as Tina Turner (born 1939), American singer
Anna Mae Hays (1920-2018), brigadier general in the United States Army
Anna Mae He (born 1999), the subject of a custody battle between He's biological parents and foster parents
Anna May Hutchison (1925–1998), American baseball player
Anna Mae Routledge (born 1982), Canadian actress
Anna Mae Winburn (1913–1999), African-American vocalist and jazz bandleader
Anna May Wong (1905–1961), Chinese American movie star

Television
"Anna Mae", is also the final episode of ABC's legal drama How to Get Away with Murder 's second season.

Feminine given names
Compound given names